Tullio Baraglia (21 July 1934 – 23 November 2017) was an Italian rower who competed in the 1960 Summer Olympics and in the 1968 Summer Olympics.

He was born in Gera Lario.

In 1960 he was a crew member of the Italian boat which won the silver medal in the coxless four event at the 1960 Summer Olympics. At the 1961 European Rowing Championships, he won gold with the coxless four in Prague. Eight years after his first Olympic appearance, he won the bronze medal with the Italian boat in the coxless four competition at the 1968 Summer Olympics.

References 

1934 births
2017 deaths
Italian male rowers
Olympic rowers of Italy
Olympic silver medalists for Italy
Olympic bronze medalists for Italy
Olympic medalists in rowing
Medalists at the 1960 Summer Olympics
Medalists at the 1968 Summer Olympics
Rowers at the 1960 Summer Olympics
Rowers at the 1968 Summer Olympics
Sportspeople from the Province of Como
European Rowing Championships medalists
20th-century Italian people